Get Together with Andy Williams is the twenty-fourth studio album by American pop singer Andy Williams which was released on October 6, 1969, by Columbia Records and contained covers of recent hits. The one new song was "You Are", which was written by Mac Davis.

The album made its first appearance on the Top LPs chart in the issue of  Billboard magazine dated November 8, 1969, and remained there for 21 weeks, peaking at number 27.  It entered the UK album chart on December 27 of that year and reached number 13 over the course of 10 weeks, and the Recording Industry Association of America awarded the album Gold certification on February 19, 1970.

The album was released on compact disc for the first time as one of two albums on one CD by Collectables Records on January 22, 2002, the other album being Williams's Columbia release from the spring of 1970, Raindrops Keep Fallin' on My Head.  Collectables included this CD in a box set entitled Classic Album Collection, Vol. 2, which contains 15 of his studio albums and two compilations and was released on November 29, 2002.

Reception

Billboard magazine felt that "his fresh, warm interpretation of the familiar hits makes this another winner. His easygoing style is especially effective on 'Yesterday When I Was Young' and 'Quentin's Theme'."

Track listing

Side one
 "My Cherie Amour" (Henry Cosby, Sylvia Moy, Stevie Wonder) – 3:02
 "You Are" (Mac Davis) – 2:32
 "Yesterday When I Was Young" (Charles Aznavour, Herbert Kretzmer) – 3:52
 "Love Theme from Romeo and Juliet (A Time for Us)" from Romeo and Juliet (Larry Kusik, Nino Rota, Eddie Snyder) – 2:35
 "Quentin's Theme (Shadows of the Night)" from Dark Shadows (Robert Cobert, Charles Randolph Grean) – 3:09

Side two
 "Good Morning Starshine" from Hair; performed with The Osmond Brothers and Friends  (Galt MacDermot, James Rado, Gerome Ragni) – 4:15
 "Sweet Caroline" (Neil Diamond) – 3:25
 "Get Together" performed with Loadstone  (Chester Powers) – 3:56
 "More Today Than Yesterday" performed with The Osmond Brothers  (Pat Upton) – 2:58
 "Put a Little Love in Your Heart" performed with Loadstone and Girls  (Jackie DeShannon, Jimmy Holiday, Randy Myers) – 2:18
 "Aquarius/Let the Sunshine In" from Hair; performed with The Osmond Brothers  (MacDermot, Rado, Ragni) – 3:51

Recording dates
From the liner notes for the CD:

June 16, 1969 – "You Are"
July 8, 1969 – "Yesterday When I Was Young", "Love Theme from Romeo and Juliet (A Time for Us)", "Quentin's Theme (Shadows of the Night)"
July 10, 1969 – "Good Morning Starshine", "More Today Than Yesterday", "Aquarius/Let the Sunshine In"
July 12, 1969 – "My Cherie Amour", "Sweet Caroline"
August 18, 1969 – August 26, 1969 - "Get Together", "Put a Little Love in Your Heart"

Personnel
From the liner notes for the original album:

Andy Williams - vocals
Jerry Fuller - producer
Al Capps - arranger, conductor
Peter Romano - engineer
Guy Webster - cover photo

References

Bibliography

1969 albums
Andy Williams albums
Columbia Records albums
Albums produced by Jerry Fuller